Triplett may refer to:

Places
In the United States
Triplett, Kentucky
Triplett, Missouri
Triplett, Clay County, West Virginia
Triplett, Roane County, West Virginia

Other uses
 Triplett (surname)

See also
Triplet (disambiguation)